Konsortium Transnasional Berhad (KTB) is one of the largest public bus operator in Malaysia. The company provides services of stage buses and express buses covering all major cities and towns in Peninsular Malaysia as well as routes to Singapore. KTB debut on Bursa Malaysia on 15 June 2007.

With the most extensive network of bus services in Peninsular Malaysia through more than 1,500 buses with more than 250 routes, plus more than 1,000 trips per day, is it can be concluded that the company can serve more than 60 million passengers a year.

Up to date, KTB is the biggest market player in Malaysia with a service brand 'Transnasional' became a major leader in the intercity express bus industry in Peninsular Malaysia. Apart from the 'Transnational', KTB also provides express bus service 'Plusliner' and luxury bus under the brand 'Nice'. Besides intercity express bus, KTB also operates stage bus 'Cityliner' and as a service provider for 'Nadiputra' for Putrajaya Corporation, & 'Go KL City Bus' a free bus service for Land Public Transport Commission (Malaysia) (SPAD).

Its operations are divided into two categories, namely express buses' and stage or local buses.

Express services

Transnasional
Plusliner
Nice executive coaches
SKS KL (Deceased)
SKMK Ekspres Nasional

Stage bus services

While all stage buses now operate under the name and bear the livery of the Cityliner brandname, the routes still belong to specific subsidiary companies. Many of the companies existed as bus operators prior to being bought over by Nadi Bhd.
Central Province Wellesley Transport Co Sdn Bhd - Penang routes
Kenderaan Klang Banting Bhd - Kuala Lumpur and Selangor routes
Syarikat Kenderaan Melayu Kelantan Bhd - Kelantan routes
Kenderaan Langkasuka Sdn Bhd (operating under the United Transport Co brandname) - Kedah, Penang and Perlis routes
Sistem Kenderaan Seremban - Kuala Lumpur and Negeri Sembilan routes
Kenderaan Bas Jelebu Sdn Bhd - Negeri Sembilan routes
Kenderaan Bas Linggi Sdn Bhd - Negeri Sembilan routes
Kenderaan Bas Port Dickson Sdn Bhd - Negeri Sembilan routes
Kenderaan Bas Seremban Sdn Bhd - Negeri Sembilan routes
Kuala Selangor Omnibus Co Bhd - Selangor route
Len Chee Omnibus Co Sdn Bhd - Kuala Lumpur routes
Min Sen Omnibus Co Sdn Bhd - Penang routes
Sam Lian Omnibus Sdn Bhd - Penang routes
Syarikat Rembau Tampin - Negeri Sembilan routes
Syarikat Labu Sendayan - Negeri Sembilan routes
Starise - Negeri Sembilan routes
Syarikat Tg Keramat Temerloh Utara- Central Pahang routes
Tanjung Karang Transportation Sdn Bhd - Selangor routes
The Kuala Lumpur-Klang-Port Swettenham Omnibus Co Bhd - Kuala Lumpur and Selangor routes

Cityliner-Kuala Lumpur and around several state route
Airport Liner-Airport Shuttle routes (Deceased)

See also
 Greyhound Lines
 Rapid KL

References

External links

Bus transport in Malaysia
Companies listed on Bursa Malaysia